In Greek mythology, the name Laonome (Ancient Greek:  'law of the people' derived from laos "people" and nomos, "law") may refer to:

Laonome, daughter of Guneus, possible spouse of Alcaeus and mother of Amphitryon, Anaxo and Perimede. She was a woman of Pheneus where Heracles migrated first and lived with her after he was expelled by Eurystheus. This happened before the hero went to Thebes and later on settled there.
Laonome, daughter of Amphitryon and Alcmene (thus granddaughter of the precedent), sister of Iphicles and half-sister of Heracles. She married an Argonaut, either Euphemus or Polyphemus.
Laonome, mother by Hodoedocus of Kalliaros, eponym of the city Kalliaros in Locris.

Notes

References 

 Pausanias, Description of Greece with an English Translation by W.H.S. Jones, Litt.D., and H.A. Ormerod, M.A., in 4 Volumes. Cambridge, MA, Harvard University Press; London, William Heinemann Ltd. 1918. Online version at the Perseus Digital Library
 Pausanias, Graeciae Descriptio. 3 vols. Leipzig, Teubner. 1903.  Greek text available at the Perseus Digital Library.
 Pseudo-Apollodorus, The Library with an English Translation by Sir James George Frazer, F.B.A., F.R.S. in 2 Volumes, Cambridge, MA, Harvard University Press; London, William Heinemann Ltd. 1921. Online version at the Perseus Digital Library. Greek text available from the same website.
 Stephanus of Byzantium, Stephani Byzantii Ethnicorum quae supersunt, edited by August Meineike (1790-1870), published 1849. A few entries from this important ancient handbook of place names have been translated by Brady Kiesling. Online version at the Topos Text Project.

Women in Greek mythology
Characters in Greek mythology